The 2019–20 Loyola Marymount Lions men's basketball team represented Loyola Marymount University during the 2019–20 NCAA Division I men's basketball season. The Lions were led by sixth-year head coach Mike Dunlap. They played their home games at Gersten Pavilion in Los Angeles, California as members of the West Coast Conference. They finished the season 11–21 overall and 4–12 in WCC play to finish in eighth place. They defeated San Diego in the first round of the WCC tournament before losing in the second round to San Francisco.

On March 8, 2020, head coach Mike Dunlap was fired. He finished at LMU with a six-year record of 81–108. On Mach 20, the school announced that Marquette associate head coach Stan Johnson had been named the new head coach of the Lions.

Previous season
The Lions finished the 2018–19 season finished the season 22–12, 8–8 in WCC play to finish in a tie for fifth place. They lost to Pepperdine in the second round of the WCC tournament. They were invited to the CBI where they defeated California Baptist and Brown before losing to South Florida in the quarterfinals.

Offseason

Departures

Incoming transfers

2019 recruiting class

Roster

Schedule and results

|-
!colspan=12 style=| Non-conference regular season

|-
!colspan=12 style=|WCC regular season

|-
!colspan=12 style=|WCC tournament

Source

References

Loyola Marymount Lions men's basketball seasons
Loyola Marymount
Loyola Marymount basketball, men
Loyola Marymount basketball, men
Loyola Marymount basketball, men
Loyola Marymount basketball, men